The Old Mill Road Bridge is a historic bridge near Rocky Ridge, Frederick County, Maryland, United States. The bridge spans Owens Creek southwest of Rocky Ridge on Old Mill Road. It was built in 1882 by the Pittsburgh Bridge Company, Pittsburgh, Pennsylvania.

The Old Mill Road Bridge was listed on the National Register of Historic Places in 1979.

See also
List of bridges documented by the Historic American Engineering Record in Maryland
List of bridges on the National Register of Historic Places in Maryland

References

External links

, including photo in 1977, at Maryland Historical Trust

Road bridges on the National Register of Historic Places in Maryland
Bridges in Frederick County, Maryland
Historic American Engineering Record in Maryland
National Register of Historic Places in Frederick County, Maryland
Pratt truss bridges in the United States
Metal bridges in the United States